Willy Semmelrogge (15 March 1923 – 10 April 1984) was a German actor. He appeared in 65 films and television shows between 1957 and 1984.

Partial filmography
 People in the Net (1959) as Lauer
 Manhattan Night of Murder (1965) as Doc
 Fast ein Held (1967)
  (1968) as Inspektor Kristlieb
 Liebe und so weiter (1968) as Monk
  (1973) as 1. Museumsbeamter (uncredited)
 Ein für allemal (1973) as Lokführer
 The Enigma of Kaspar Hauser (1974) as Circus director
 Tatort (1974–1980, TV Series, 22 episodes) as Kriminalhauptmeister Willi Kreutzer
  (1975) as Herr Heinrich
  (1976) as Lebrun
 Woyzeck (1979) as Doctor
 Derrick (1981, TV Series) as Herr Mahler
 Auf Achse (1980, TV Series) as Otto

References

External links

1923 births
1984 deaths
German male film actors
Male actors from Berlin
German male television actors
20th-century German male actors